Momentum is a 2015 action thriller film directed by Stephen Campanelli, and starring Olga Kurylenko, Morgan Freeman and James Purefoy. A high tech thief is pursued by mysterious government agents.

Plot

Alex (Olga Kurylenko), a trained ex-military agent-turned-thief, gets pulled into a high-tech bank heist (her 'one last job') by her former partner Kevin. During the heist, they steal a bag of diamonds which hides a valuable flash drive containing incriminating evidence. Alex keeps the diamonds as her cut of the heist and relaxes at a hotel as the rest of the proceeds are laundered. They are pursued by a team of agents led by Mr. Washington (James Purefoy). Kevin is tortured and killed as Alex hides under the bed. Alex escapes and is involved in a cat-and-mouse chase across the city. Kevin's wife and child are used as bait to lure Alex. Alex tries to uncover the conspiracy behind her pursuers. 
Alex eventually learns they have been sent by an anonymous United States Senator (Morgan Freeman) to retrieve the flash drive.

Cast
 Olga Kurylenko as Alexis "Alex" Faraday
 Colin Moss as Kevin Fuller
 Lee-Anne Summers as Penny Fuller
 James Purefoy as Mr. "Washington"
 Hlomla Dandala as Mr. "Madison"
 Morgan Freeman as "Senator"
 Karl Thaning as Doug MacArthur
 Shelley Nicole as Ms. "Clinton"

Production

The film was directed by Stephen Campanelli in his directorial debut, and was written by Adam Marcus and Debra Sullivan. It was co-produced by Anton Ernst. The film was written as the entry point in a film series.

The film stars Olga Kurylenko as the protagonist "Alexis", James Purefoy as the antagonist "Mr. Washington", and Morgan Freeman as the U.S. senator. Vincent Cassel was originally to star opposite Kurylenko, but was replaced by Purefoy. Director Campanelli wanted to cast Purefoy based on his performance in the television series "The Following". Freeman offered his services to Campanelli for his directorial debut based on their prior working relationship, when he was a cameraman for Clint Eastwood.

The film had its world premiere at the 2015 Fantasia International Film Festival, on July 22, 2015, in Montreal, Quebec, Canada, the hometown of the director. The film was released in the United States on October 16, 2015.

Reception
Momentum received generally negative reviews. On Rotten Tomatoes the film has an approval rating of 26% based on reviews from 31 critics, with an average score of 3.6/10. On Metacritic the film has a score of 18 out of 100 based on reviews from 6 critics, indicating "overwhelming dislike".

The Hollywood Reporter called it "a daft action flick" and "With one senseless set piece after another, the film's eponymous forward movement should carry it out of theaters quickly".
Gary Goldstein of the Los Angeles Times wrote: "Momentum is a spectacularly generic action-thriller that, despite its sleekly shot and edited mayhem, lands with a giant thud."

During the film's opening weekend in the United Kingdom, the film only managed to gross £46 ($69) from the 10 theatres it was displayed in. In Russia it earned $250,000 in its opening weekend. In Malaysia, it grossed $60,126 over two weeks, and in Thailand, it grossed $43,940 on its opening weekend. Overall, it was a box office bomb.

References

External links
 

2015 films
2010s English-language films
English-language South African films
2015 action thriller films
American action thriller films
South African action thriller films
Films shot in South Africa
Techno-thriller films
2015 directorial debut films
Films directed by Stephen Campanelli
2010s American films